Pontllanfraith is a large village and community located in the Sirhowy Valley in Caerphilly County Borough, Wales, within the historic boundaries of Monmouthshire. It is situated adjacent to the town of Blackwood, with the Sirhowy River passing through both locations. The village includes the communities of the Penllwyn, Springfield and The Bryn. The population of the community at the 2011 census was 8,552.

Etymology 
The name of the village is a combination of  "bridge" +  "lake" +  "speckled", "the bridge of the speckled lake". Although a masculine noun in Modern Welsh,  "lake" was feminine in the medieval language of the south, hence the mutated feminine form , rather than unmutated masculine  as would be found today. The word  probably refers to speckled sunlight on the water of a pool in the Sirhowy River.

History 
The Penllwyn Manor, an old stone building which is now a public house, was originally part of the Tredegar Estate, and is believed to be the original home of the family of the pirate Henry Morgan.

In 1912, at the 17th-century mill in Gelligroes amateur wireless operator Artie Moore picked up a distress signal from the RMS Titanic using wireless receiving equipment.

Pontllanfraith was home to a Welsh coal mining community during the early to mid 20th century, providing homes for men working in a number of local pits such as Wyllie, Penallta, and Oakdale. In 1874 and 1875, Gelligroes Colliery was established, striking the Mynyddislwyn Red Ash vein, although the pits were later abandoned in 1875 due to water problems. In 1914, Lloyd's Navigation Steam Coal Co. Ltd. restarted work at the colliery, but World War I caused it to stop again. The colliery was abandoned for a second time in 1915. The colliery was used for a final time in 1917 after being acquired by the Tredegar Iron & Coal Co. Ltd., but was abandoned again in 1918.

2011 census
Following the 2011 census, Caerphilly County Borough Council published a profile for each ward. This profile covered population, age structure, economic activity and inactivity, ethic groups, national identity, marital status, hours worked, car/van ownership, lone parents, health and provision of unpaid care, qualifications, household spaces and accommodation types, household tenure, industry of employment, household composition, occupation groups and knowledge of Welsh. Notable findings include:
Out of the 8,552 residents, 4,230 were male and 4,322 were female.
30-44-year-olds were the largest age group, making up 19.5% of the total population.
99.1% of the population was white.
70.5% of males were economically active compared to 59.5% of females (aged 16-74).
80.6% identified as 'Welsh' whilst 22.6% identified as British (more than one option could be selected).
6,900 residents were aged 16+, with 48.3% being married.
76.8% of households owned at least one car/van.
68.7% of households were owner occupied.
85.9% of the population aged three and above had no knowledge of the Welsh language.

Education 
In 1926, Pontllanfraith Secondary School opened. In 1944, under the Tripartite System, it became Pontllanfraith Grammar School, and in 1959 it became Pontllanfraith Grammar Technical School (incorporating Pontllanfraith Technical School). In 1975, it became known as Pontllanfraith Comprehensive School, after incorporating Ynysddu Secondary Modern School (which existed from 1948 to 1975).

Pontllanfraith Comprehensive School closed in 2016. As part of the Welsh Government's 21st Century Schools Programme, Pontllanfraith Comprehensive School and Oakdale Comprehensive School were merged together to form Islwyn High School. Due to construction being incomplete, pupils remained on the Pontllanfraith and Oakdale sites until 2017 before moving to the new building located on the former site of Oakdale Colliery. On September 28 2017, the then First Minister Carwyn Jones officially opened Islwyn High School.

Pontllanfraith is home to numerous primary schools; Bryn Primary School, Penllwyn Primary School and Pontllanfraith Primary School.

Politics

Pontllanfraith is a Caerphilly County Borough Council ward, comprising three seats. The current councillors are Mike Adams, Patricia Cook and Colin Gordon. At a parliamentary and devolved level, Pontllanfraith is part of the constituency of Islwyn.

Local election results

2022

2017

2012

2008

2004

1999

1995

Council offices
Caerphilly County Borough Council previous had council offices at the building named Pontllanfraith House, although they now been demolished. The land has since been sold to a property developer and construction on a new housing estate has begun. This was regarded as a controversial move, both prior to and following the demolition of Pontllanfraith House, with councilors raising concerns about affordable housing for the existing population.

Transport
Pontllanfraith Low Level was a passenger station on the Taff Vale Extension of the Newport, Abergavenny and Hereford Railway. Originally named Tredegar Junction, opened in 1857, it was renamed to Pontllanfraith in 1905, and then to Pontllanfraith Low Level in 1950. The various junctions around the station gave it access to both the Rhymney Railway and the Rumney Railway. The railway closed to most freight traffic on 9 June 1958, and the station was later closed on June 15 1964.

Pontllanfraith is served by the following bus routes:
5 - Blackwood - Pant Estate (Stagecoach South Wales)
6 - Blackwood - Wyllie (Harris Coaches)
7 - Blackwood - Pontypridd (Harris Coaches)
9 - Blackwood - Penllwyn (Harris Coaches)
11 - Blackwood - Gelligaer (Harris Coaches)
26 - Blackwood - Cardiff (Stagecoach South Wales)
52 - Blackwood - Abertillery (Stagecoach South Wales)
56 - Tredegar - Newport (Stagecoach South Wales)
96 - Crosskeys - Tredegar (Stagecoach South Wales)
151 - Blackwood - Newport (Stagecoach South Wales)
901 - Blackwood - Ystrad Mynach Station (Adventure Travel)
The 26 and 151 services are run by Stagecoach Gold, and the 901 is a rail linc service.

Health 
Pontllanfraith is under the jurisdiction of the Aneurin Bevan University Health Board. Blackwood Medical Group, an approved training practice, runs two centres - Avicenna Medical Centre and Oakdale Medical Centre, with the former being situated in Pontllanfraith. Pontllanfraith Medical Centre is located on the same site and is contracted to provide core services such as immunisations, child health surveillance and limited minor surgery procedures alongside a number of additional services. Pontllanfraith Pharmacy, an independent NHS Community Pharmacy, is situated adjacent to Pontllanfraith Medical Centre.

Sport 
Pontllanfraith Rugby Football Club run a number of teams, with the first fifteen playing their home matches at Islwyn Park. The club has been in existence for many years and the first entry on the captain's board relates to the season 1958–59. Ponllanfraith Diamonds Cycle Club founded by Roland Morgan in 1958, which spawned a number of successful cyclists until it disbanded in 1968. Pontllanfraith A.F.C. was a football club which operated from 1947 until 1992, when they merged with Fields Park Athletic A.F.C. to form Fields Park Pontllanfraith. The club was dissolved in 2005.

Pontllanfraith Leisure Centre is situated on the same site as the former comprehensive school. Although still operational, Caerphilly County Borough Council has expressed intentions of closing it to invest the £125,000 annual running cost elsewhere. In 2019, a High Court bid to overturn the council's planned closure succeeded under the principle of "public sector equality duty". However, in 2020, the Court of Appeal overturned the decision, and an appeal to the Supreme Court was rejected.

Listed buildings 

Pontllanfraith is home to two Grade II* listed structures; Gelligroes Mill and Penllwyn Manor. Both were listed on 25 May 1962.
There are also a number of Grade II listed structures in Pontllanfraith: 
Bridge over Sirhowy River at Gelligroes
Cwmbrynar aka Cwmbraenar Cottage
Former Mynyddislwyn Urban District Council Offices (now the Groundwork Wales office)
Garden Wall at Penllwyn
Gelligroes Millhouse and attached Barn
Heather Cottage
Monument to Elizabeth Jones at New Bethel
Monument to Margaret Williams at New Bethel
Monument to Martha Williams at New Bethel
Monument to Rosser Williams at New Bethel
Monument to Thomas Henry Thomas at New Bethel
Monuments to James Thomas and family at New Bethel
New Bethel Chapel
Nicholas monument at New Bethel
Pair of chest tombs at Siloh Presbyterian Church
Shangri La 
Siloh Presbyterian Church
Stable range at Tyle-gwyn
Tyle-gwyn
Wall, railings and gates at New Bethel Chapel graveyard
War Memorial 
Former Tramroad Bridge (partly in Pontllanfraith)

Notable people 
James Dean Bradfield (born 1969), lead singer of the Manic Street Preachers.
Julian Hodge (1904-2004), founder of the Bank of Wales.
Neil Kinnock (born 1942), former Labour Party leader, MP, and Leader of the Opposition. Kinnock owned a house in Pontllanfraith.
Roy Hughes (1925-2003), former MP and life peer. Hughes was born in Pontllanfraith.
Artie Moore (1887-1949), wireless operator who received a distress message from the Titanic in the village.
Liam Angel (born 1999), professional footballer who attended Pontllanfraith Comprehensive School.

See also 
Pontllanfraith RFC
Pontllanfraith Low Level railway station
South Wales Valleys
Mynyddislwyn

References

Villages in Caerphilly County Borough
Communities in Caerphilly County Borough